Willoughby's, which proclaims itself (the world's) Largest Camera (department) Store, was described in 1997 by The New York Times as "New York City's oldest camera store." It was founded by Charles G. Willoughby in 1898, By 1963 the store operated as Willoughby and Peerless Camera, and simply Willoughby-Peerless (without the word Camera) by 1992; by 2010 ownership had shifted, and the name once again was simply Willoughby's.

Competition
For a while, the 1967-founded 47th Street Photo, about which tourists with a halting English would mistakenly ask for 47th Street Camera, was a geographically not too distant competitor, but 47th closed a year before Willoughby's celebrated its 100th anniversary.

Other areas in which the store competed were computers and other business machines, and a film lab.

Ownership
Ownership of Willoughby's has always been private. Most recently these have included:
 Erich Hirschfeld, who had formerly managed the business, purchased it in 1963
 Berkey, Inc., "which entered Chapter 11 bankruptcy proceedings" in 1988
 Queen Street Camera Inc., a Canadian firm that, eight years after its own founding acquired Willoughby's
 Joseph Douek

References

External links
  Official website

1898 establishments in New York City
Consumer electronics retailers in the United States